Devlet Bahçeli Bridge, located in Adana, Turkey, is a combined road-rail bridge  under construction. Named after Turkish politician Devlet Bahçeli (born 1948), it crosses the Seyhan River.

The bridge will connect the districts Seyhan and Yüreğir in Adana. It is expected that the bridge will be the fourth longest in the country. It will carry three motorway lanes and one railway line in each direction. It is projected that the bridge's daily traffic will be at 55,000–60,000 vehicles. The project's cost is budgeted at  120 million (approximately US$42.5 million as of March 2016).

It is commissioned by the Metropolitan Municipality of Adana. The construction of the bridge began officially with the foundation stone-laying in a ceremony held on 30 March 2016. It is expected that the bridge will be opened in the second half of 2017.

The bridge is named after Devlet Bahçeli, current leader of the Nationalist Movement Party (MHP). He is a native of Osmaniye, which was part of Adana Province in the past.

References

Road bridges in Turkey
Railway bridges in Turkey
Bridges in Adana
Bridges over the Seyhan River
Transport infrastructure under construction in Turkey
Bridges under construction